The Thirteenth Hour may refer to:

 The Thirteenth Hour (1927 film), an American silent film mystery
 The Thirteenth Hour (1947 film), an American mystery film noir